Madiun Putra Football Club is an  Indonesian football club based in Madiun, East Java. They currently compete in the Liga 3.

Players

References

External links
 

Football clubs in Indonesia
Football clubs in East Java
Association football clubs established in 1986
1986 establishments in Indonesia